Alibayevo (Älebay) is a rural locality (a village) in Abzanovsky Selsoviet, Zianchurinsky District, Bashkortostan, Russia. The population was 140 as of 2010. There are 3 streets.

Geography 
Alibayevo is located 62 km southeast of Isyangulovo (the district's administrative centre) by road. Mukhamedyanovo is the nearest rural locality.

References 

Rural localities in Zianchurinsky District